Al-Isharat wa’l-tanbihat ("The Book of Directives and Remarks") is apparently one of the last books of Avicenna which is written in Arabic.

Author

Avicenna was born in Afsanah at 980, a village near Bukhara (now in present-day Uzbekistan). His father counted as ruler of a region by the name of keramaytan. Avicenna along with his family after moving to Bukhara, continued his studies. According to Nasr, Avicenna had many teachers including Nātelī physicians Abū Manṣūr Qomrī and Abū Sahl Masīḥī. Avicenna wrote nearly 250 works on diverse sciences in medieval period including long and short treatises such as the Daneshnameh Alaei (The Book of Science Dedicated to 'Alii' al-Dawlah). Avicenna wrote Isharat when he was under the criticism of certain literary scholars, showing his skill in Arabic language by a philosophy book as Isharat. Nasr refers to the book of Isharat as the last and greatest masterpiece of Avicenna.

Content
Isharat described as a comprehensive and mature book by Avicenna. This book is divided wholly into two parts. The first part is about logic, which in turn is divided into ten subparts. The second part is about philosophy, which is in turn is divided into ten subparts. Avicenna himself calls the subparts of logic  “Nahj” or style and the philosophy part “Namat.” Inanti divided it to four parts: logic, physics, metaphysics and Sufism. The titles of Al Isharat are drawn from the titles of the majority of chapters in the whole work.

Title of book
The word “Isharat” is a synonym for signs, remarks, indications and hints. Also “Tanbihat” is a synonym for words such as admonitions, warnings and caution. According to Inati, Isharat signifies Avicenna’s own views. In other words, when Ibn Sina refers to Isharah, he shows his opinion. When he refers to Tanbihat, he shows the faults of other philosophers in a subject. Sometimes Avicenna refers to Isharah by words like A follow up, a closing comment and wish. Also he refers to Tanbiha by a word like delusion.

Characters
Ibn Sina wrote the book in such a way that just philosophers understand it. Avicenna himself points out that this book is not suitable for non-philosophers and those who are of sharp-mind are right to deal with the book.

Commentaries
Many commentaries have been written about this book and most famous ones are Nasir al-Din al-Tusi Tusi (Sharh al-isharat) and Imam Fakhr Razi and an explanation and description of Allame Hassan Hasanzadeh Amoli.

Translations
This book is translated into Persian and English and other languages. Shams Inati and keven brown translate some parts of book to English.

References

Resources
 
  

Islamic philosophical texts
11th-century Arabic books
Philosophical literature of the medieval Islamic world
Works by Avicenna